Gary Douglas Ross (born September 16, 1947) is an American former professional baseball player, a right-handed pitcher in the Major Leagues from 1968 to 1977. He played for the Chicago Cubs, San Diego Padres, and California Angels.

Biography

Ross appeared in 283 Major League games, 59 as a starting pitcher. He was traded along with Joe Niekro and Frankie Librán from the Cubs to the Padres for Dick Selma on April 24, 1969. He lost a Padres' club-record 11 consecutive decisions in  when the expansion team lost a franchise-record 110 times, finishing 41 games out of first place.

All told, he gave up 764 hits and 288 bases on balls in 713 innings pitched, with seven saves and 378 strikeouts.

References

External links
, or Retrosheet, or Pura Pelota

1947 births
Living people
Arizona Instructional League Cubs players
Baseball players from Pennsylvania
California Angels players
Chicago Cubs players
Hawaii Islanders players
Major League Baseball pitchers
Sportspeople from McKeesport, Pennsylvania
Quincy Cubs players
Salt Lake City Bees players
San Antonio Missions players
San Diego Padres players
Tacoma Cubs players
Tigres de Aragua players
American expatriate baseball players in Venezuela